The Galaxy is an Australian Turf Club Group One Thoroughbred open handicap horse race, run over a distance of 1100 metres at Rosehill Gardens Racecourse in Sydney, Australia in March or April. Total prize money for the race is A$1,000,000.

History

Grade
 1972–1978 - Principal Race
 1979 - Listed Race
 1980–1983 - Group 2
 1984 onwards - Group 1

Venue
 1972–2006 - Randwick Racecourse 
 2007 - Warwick Farm Racecourse
 2008–2012 - Randwick Racecourse
 2013 onwards - Rosehill Gardens Racecourse

Winners

 2022 - Shelby Sixtysix
 2021 - Eduardo
 2020 - I Am Excited
 2019 - Nature Strip
 2018 - In Her Time
 2017 - Russian Revolution
 2016 - Griante
 2015 - Sweet Idea
 2014 - Tiger Tees
 2013 - Bel Sprinter
 2012 - Temple Of Boom
 2011 - Atomic Force
 2010 - †Shellscrape
 2009 - Nicconi
 2008 - Typhoon Zed
 2007 - Magnus
 2006 - Proprietor
 2005 - Charge Forward
 2004 - Spark Of Life
 2003 - Snowland
 2002 - Mistegic
 2001 - Padstow
 2000 - Black Bean
 1999 - Masked Party
 1998 - La Baraka
 1997 - Accomplice
 1996 - Gold Ace
 1995 - Magic Of Money
 1994 - Jetball
 1993 - Sublimate
 1992 - Schillaci
 1991 - Mr Tiz
 1990 - Potrero
 1989 - Targlish
 1988 - Snippets
 1987 - Princely Heart
 1986 - Rich Fields Lad
 1985 - Manuan
 1984 - Mr Illusion
 1983 - Bronze Spirit
 1982 - Grey Receiver
 1981 - Grey Receiver
 1980 - Hit It Benny
 1979 - Mistress Anne
 1978 - Luskin Star
 1977 - Salaam
 1976 - Wayne's Bid
 1975 - Bletchingly
 1974 - Starglow
 1973 - Kista
 1972 - Playbill
 
 
† Ortensia was first past the post but was disqualified for positive drug test

See also
 List of Australian Group races
 Group races

External links 
First three placegetters The Galaxy (ATC)

References

Open sprint category horse races
Group 1 stakes races in Australia
Randwick Racecourse